Recreation Ground is a multi-use stadium in Caersws, Wales.  It is currently used mostly for football matches and is the home ground of Caersws F.C. The stadium holds 4,000 people (375 seated) and has hosted the Welsh League Cup final.

Caersws
Football venues in Wales
Stadiums in Wales
Multi-purpose stadiums in the United Kingdom